By Touch is a 1986 Polish film directed by Magdalena Łazarkiewicz and written by Łazarkiewicz and Ilona Lepkowska. It was released in Poland on September 24, 1986.

Cast
Barbara Chojecka
Tadeusz Chudecki as Priest
Maria Ciunelis as Teresa Jankowska
Zuzanna Helska
Wieslaw Kowalczyk
Izabela Laskowska
Antoni Lazarkiewicz as Tomek
Milogost Reczek as Doctor
Teresa Sawicka as Doctor
Krzysztof Stelmaszyk as Adam, Anna's husband
Grażyna Szapołowska as Anna
Irena Szymkiewicz
Jerzy Trela as Professor
Wanda Weslaw-Idzinska
Maria Zbyszewska

Awards
In 1986, By Touch won the Grand Prix at the Créteil International Women's Film Festival and the award for Best Cinematography at the Polish Film Festival.

References

IMDb links

1986 films
1980s Polish-language films
1986 drama films
Films scored by Zbigniew Preisner
Polish drama films